This species may be confused with either the gold barb (Barbodes semifasciolatus var. schuberti) or the goldfinned barb (Puntius sachsii).

The golden barb or golden dwarf barb (Pethia gelius) is a species of cyprinid fish native to inland waters in Asia, and is found in Pakistan, India, and Bangladesh. It has also been introduced to waters in Colombia.  It natively inhabits rivers, and standing water with a silty bottom.  They live in a tropical climate in water with a 6.0 - 6.5 pH, a water hardness of 8 - 15 dGH, and a temperature range of 68 - 77 °F (20 - 25 °C).  It feeds on benthic and planktonic crustaceans, and insects. This species can grow in length up to  TL. It can also be found in the aquarium trade.

The golden barb is an open water, substrate egg-scatterer, and adults do not guard the eggs.  They primarily spawn in shallow water.

See also
List of freshwater aquarium fish species

References 

Pethia
Barbs (fish)
Fish of Pakistan
Fish described in 1822